Balintore is a small farming community in south west Victoria, Australia. It is approximately 15 km north of Colac.

Balintore is located between Lake Colac and Lake Corangamite. 

Dairy and beef farming are the main industries in the area, with onion growing also popular in the past. 

Balintore once had a primary school. In 1953 there were at least 23 children attending the Balintore primary school. When the school closed the students were then bussed to Alvie Consolidated School.

History
Up to 1890 Balintore was known as the Balintore estate and was a single farming area of 4,072 acres, an area which approximately conforms to the locality's current area.
In 1897 the estate had been broken up and sold off.

Sports
Balintore had a cricket team in the 1930s.

A tennis club also existed for many years. The courts were removed around 1994.

Flora
The Spiny Peppercress Lepidium aschersonii was identified as growing in abundance on private land within Balintore by the Victorian Government.

References 

Towns in Victoria (Australia)